Tyukuli N'Diklam (ruled c.1420–c.1440) was the fourth ruler, or Burba, of the Jolof Empire.

References

15th-century monarchs in Africa
Year of birth missing
1440 deaths